Andriy Petrovych Strikharskyi (born 4 August 1981) is a Ukrainian politician currently serving as a People's Deputy of Ukraine representing Ukraine's 196th electoral district from Servant of the People since 2019.

Early life and career 
Andriy Petrovych Strikharskyi was born on 4 August 1981 in the city of Oleksandriia, in central Ukraine. He is a graduate of the Kyiv National University of Construction and Architecture, specialising in industrial and civil construction. From 2005 to 2019, he was director of the Status Group real estate construction company, as well as chairman of the supervisory board. He is also the founder of UkrHranitIndustria TOV and director of the Berezniakyzhytlobud construction and investment company.

Political career 
Prior to running for the Verkhovna Rada (Ukraine's national parliament), Strikharskyi was an independent candidate for the Kyiv City Council during the 2014 Kyiv local election. However, he was not successfully elected.

In the 2019 Ukrainian parliamentary election, Strikharskyi ran as the candidate of Servant of the People for People's Deputy of Ukraine in Ukraine's 196th electoral district. At the time of the election, he was an independent. He was successfully elected, defeating incumbent People's Deputy  with 38.89% of the vote compared to Bobov's 27.30%.

In the Verkhovna Rada, Strikharskyi joined the Servant of the People faction, as well as the Verkhovna Rada Committee on Organisation of State Power and Local Self-Government. Strikharskyi has been criticised by anti-corruption non-governmental organisation Chesno for his September 2022 vote in favour of laws which diluted the authority of government anti-corruption bodies. He is also involved in multiple anti-corruption investigations.

References 

1981 births
Living people
Ninth convocation members of the Verkhovna Rada
People from Oleksandriia
Servant of the People (political party) politicians
Kyiv National University of Construction and Architecture alumni